Bathysauropsis is the only genus in the lizard greeneye family, Bathysauropsidae.

Species
The currently recognized species in this genus are:
 Bathysauropsis gracilis (Günther, 1878) (black lizardfish)
 Bathysauropsis malayanus (Fowler, 1938)

References

Aulopiformes